John DiBartolomeo (born June 20, 1991) is an American-Israeli professional basketball player for Maccabi Tel Aviv of the Israeli Basketball Premier League and the EuroLeague. He played college basketball at the University of Rochester, where he starred in his four seasons with the Yellow Jackets, and was dubbed "one of the best players in the University of Rochester men's basketball history". DiBartolomeo played professional basketball in Spain and Israel, where he was named the Israeli League Regular Season MVP and Israeli League Cup MVP in 2017 and the Israeli League Final Four MVP in 2019.

Early life
DiBartolomeo was born in New York, to an Italian Catholic father, and a Russian-Jewish mother. He grew up in Westport, Connecticut.

He attended Staples High School in Westport, where playing basketball as a junior he was second team All-Conference and Connecticut Post Honorable Mention. As a senior he averaged 20 points a game, and was named first team All-Conference.

College career

DiBartolomeo played college basketball for the University of Rochester Yellowjackets, in the University Athletic Association (UAA), in NCAA Division 3. As a freshman in 2009–10, he led the UAA with 56 steals. He was named UAA Rookie of the Year, and Second Team All-UAA.

As a sophomore in 2010–11, he led the UAA in scoring (17.7 points per game), and was 2nd in assists (5.7 per game). He was named UAA Player of the Year, First Team All-UAA, and National Association of Basketball Coaches (NABC) All-American.

As a junior in 2011–12, he was 2nd in the UAA in scoring (19.1 points per game), 2nd in assists (145), 1st in steals (56), and 3rd in free throw percentage (89.0%). He was named All-UAA First Team, and DIII News All-American.

As a senior in 2012–13, he set career highs in scoring (22.6 points per game; top 10 in NCAA Division III), 3-point shooting (45.8%), and free throw shooting (90.8%; top 10 in NCAA Division III). He was named a consensus 1st Team All-American. He was also named UAA Player of the Year, Eastern College Athletic Conference Upstate NY Player of the Year, and East Region Player of the Year by D3hoops.com. He was named the 2013 D3hoops.com and 2013 DIII News Player of the Year, while earning spots on the NABC, D3hoops.com, DIII News, United States Basketball Writers Association All-America First Teams. He also garnered Rochester's Louis Alexander Alumni Award and was named Paychex Local Male College Athlete of the Year, which was presented by the Rochester Press Radio Club.

DiBartolomeo averaged 17.8 points per game during his four-year college basketball career, scoring 1,779 career points, which ranked him third in the school's history. His 533 career assists and 201 career steals were second on Rochester's all-time list.

Reflecting on DiBartolomeo's college career, Rochester head coach, Luke Flockerzi, stated in October 2015: "John was truly a special player for us at Rochester. He is simply the hardest-working and most-dedicated player I’ve ever coached. His humility drives him, and has created a work ethic that is unmatched."

Professional career

Palma Air Europa (2013–2015)
In August 2013, DiBartolomeo signed a three-year deal with the Spanish club CAI Zaragoza. He was later loaned by Zaragoza to Palma Air Europa of the LEB Plata (Spanish 3rd Division), for the 2013–14 season. In 33 games played with Palma, in the 2013–14 season, he averaged 15.1 points (2nd in the league), 3.6 rebounds, 4.7 assists (2nd), and 1.5 steals per game (8th), with an .868 free throw percentage (4th) and a .422 shooting percentage from three-point range (9th).

He returned to Palma for the 2014–15 season, after helping the club earn a league promotion to the LEB Oro (Spanish 2nd Division). In 28 games played with Palma, in the 2014–15 season, he averaged 11.3 points, 4.1 rebounds, 2.3 assists, and 1.6 steals per game (6th in the league), as he was 3rd in the league in free throw percentage (.890).

Maccabi Haifa (2015–2017)

On June 17, 2015, DiBartolomeo signed a two-year deal with the Israeli team Maccabi Haifa. after his contract with Zaragoza, who still owned his rights, was bought out. On February 6, 2016, DiBartolomeo recorded a season-high 22 points in a 91–56 win over Israeli powerhouse Maccabi Tel Aviv. DiBartolomeo, who made 5/7 shots from 3-point territory, was elected co-MVP of the game, alongside his teammate Gregory Vargas.

On December 25, 2016, DiBartolomeo recorded a career-high 35 points, shooting 11-of-14 from the field, along with 7 rebounds and 5 steals in a 93–85 win over Hapoel Eilat. He was subsequently named Israeli League Round 11 MVP. In 2016–17, he averaged 11.0 points, 3.9 rebounds and 3.0 assists a game in regular season, before stepping up in the playoffs, where he tallied 19.2 points, 3.5 boards and 3.0 assists per contest, steering Maccabi Haifa to the championship game. Despite falling short to Hapoel Jerusalem in the title game, DiBartolomeo was named Israeli League MVP for the 2016–17 season.

Maccabi Tel Aviv (2017–present)

2017–18 season
On June 21, 2017, DiBartolomeo signed a three-year deal with Maccabi Tel Aviv. On October 5, 2017, DiBartolomeo led Maccabi to win the 2017 Israeli League Cup by averaging 15.3 points, 5 assists, 1.6 rebounds and 1.6 steals per game. DiBartolomeo was named the Tournament MVP. On January 22, 2018, DiBartolomeo was named Maccabi's team captain, replacing Itay Segev. On June 8, 2018, DiBartolomeo earned a spot in the All-Israeli League Second Team. DiBartolomeo won the 2018 Israeli League Championship title with Maccabi.

2018–19 season
On October 22, 2018, DiBartolomeo recorded a season-high 22 points, shooting 6-of-13 from the field, along with seven rebounds and two assists in a 66–64 win over Hapoel Be'er Sheva. On November 1, 2018, DiBartolomeo was named Israeli League Player of the Month after averaging 17.3 points, 4.8 rebounds, 2.8 assists and 1.5 steals in four games played in October. On June 13, 2019, DiBartolomeo led Maccabi to their 53rd Israeli League title after defeating Maccabi Rishon LeZion 89–75 in the final. He scored 15 points by playing 18 minutes off the bench and was named the Final Four MVP.

2019–20 season
On November 7, 2019, DiBartolomeo recorded a EuroLeague career-high 19 points, shooting 6-of-8 from the field, along with three steals in a 104–78 win over Alba Berlin. On December 5, 2019, DiBartolomeo was ruled out for six months after he suffered from a pectoral muscle tear in a game against Bayern Munich. He suffered a season-ending Achilles injury on June 9, 2020. The injury was less severe than initially expected as there was no tear, and he is expected to be back for the next season.

2020–21 season
On August 13, 2020, DiBartolomeo officially signed a two-year contract extension with an option for a third year. He won his fourth straight Israeli championship with Maccabi.

National team career
DiBartolomeo is a member of the senior Israel national basketball team. On September 6, 2018, he made his first appearance for the Israeli team in a 91–73 win over Russia, recording 12 points off the bench.

Career statistics

EuroLeague

|-
| style="text-align:left;"| 2017–18
| style="text-align:left;"| Maccabi
| 28 || 6 || 12.8 || .325 || .286 || .808 || 1.6 || 1.4 || .5 || .0 || 3.3 || 3.0
|-
| style="text-align:left;"| 2018–19
| style="text-align:left;"| Maccabi
| 29 || 2 || 10.2 || .360 || .344 || .810 || 1.4 || 1.1 || .4 || .0 || 4.7 || 4.1
|- class="sortbottom"
| style="text-align:left;"| Career
| style="text-align:left;"|
| 57 || 8 || 11.4 || .345|| .324|| .809 || 1.5 || 1.2 || .5 || .0 || 4.0 || 3.5

Domestic leagues

|-
| style="text-align:center;" | 2013–14
| style="text-align:left;" rowspan=2| Palma Air Europa
| style="text-align:center;"| LEB Plata
|| 33 || 31.2 || .474 || .422 || .868 || 3.5 || 4.6 || 1.5 || 0 || 15.0
|-
| style="text-align:center;" | 2014–15
| style="text-align:center;"| LEB Oro
|| 29 || 27.4 || .408 || .398 || .890 || 4.1 || 2.2 || 1.6 || 0 || 11.4
|-
| style="text-align:center;" | 2015–16
| style="text-align:left;" rowspan=2| Maccabi Haifa
| style="text-align:center;" rowspan=4| IPL
|| 37 || 26.2 || .405 || .368 || .695 || 3.3 || 2.4 || 2.0 || 0 || 9.4
|-
| style="text-align:center;" | 2016–17
|| 33 || 28.0 || .493 || .435 || .901 || 3.7 || 2.9 || 1.7 || 0 || 12.5
|-
| style="text-align:center;" | 2017–18
| style="text-align:left;" rowspan=2| Maccabi Tel Aviv
|| 34 || 26.7 || .469 || .435 || .803 || 3.2 || 2.5 || 1.5 || .1 || 10.2
|-
| style="text-align:center;" | 2018–19
|| 36 || 22.5 || .432 || .353 || style="background:#CFECEC;"|.885 || 3.1 || 2.8 || 1.3 || .1 || 11.3
|}
Source: RealGM

References

External links
Eurobasket.com Profile
Israeli League Profile
Spanish 2nd Division Profile 
Rochester Yellowjackets bio

1991 births
Living people
American expatriate basketball people in Israel
American expatriate basketball people in Spain
American men's basketball players
American people of Italian descent
American people of Russian-Jewish descent
Basketball players from Connecticut
Israeli expatriate basketball people in Spain
Israeli men's basketball players
Israeli people of American-Jewish descent
Israeli people of Italian descent
Israeli people of Russian-Jewish descent
Jewish men's basketball players
Maccabi Haifa B.C. players
Maccabi Tel Aviv B.C. players
Point guards
Rochester Yellowjackets men's basketball players
Shooting guards
Sportspeople from Waterbury, Connecticut
Staples High School alumni